The 1873 Roscommon by-election was fought on 24 June 1873.  The byelection was fought due to the death of the incumbent MP of the Liberal Party, Fitzstephen French.  It was won by the unopposed Liberal candidate Charles French.

References

1873 elections in the United Kingdom
By-elections to the Parliament of the United Kingdom in County Roscommon constituencies
Unopposed by-elections to the Parliament of the United Kingdom (need citation)
1873 elections in Ireland